The collared whipsnake (Demansia torquata) is an elapid found in Queensland, Australia. It is found in rainforest edges and other tropical woodland areas as well as in rocky habitat and environments on offshore islands. The holotype specimen was 586 mm long.

References

Demansia
Snakes of Australia
Reptiles of Western Australia
Reptiles of Queensland
Reptiles described in 1862